Woodstock is a commuter railroad station on Metra's Union Pacific Northwest Line located in Woodstock, Illinois. The station is located on the Harvard branch of the Northwest Line and is the last stop before ; inbound trains run as far as Ogilvie Transportation Center in Chicago. The station consists of two grade-level side platforms which serve two tracks; there is a rail crossover located just north of the station. , Woodstock is the 149th busiest of the 236 non-downtown stations on the Metra system, with an average of 273 weekday boardings.

As of April 25, 2022, Woodstock is served by 23 trains (11 inbound, 12 outbound) on weekdays, by 20 trains (10 in each direction) on Saturdays, and by 15 trains (seven inbound, eight outbound) on Sundays.

At the present time, there is no ticket agent at the Woodstock station. Passengers boarding at Woodstock may buy one-way or weekend pass tickets from the Conductor for cash, or purchase an electronic ticket with Ventra. Purchases of other types of tickets or purchases using other payment methods must be done at a station with a ticket agent.

Pace connections
807 Woodstock/McHenry via Wonder Lake
808 Crystal Lake/Harvard

References

External links
 Metra station page for Woodstock
 Station from Church Street from Google Maps Street View

Metra stations in Illinois
Former Chicago and North Western Railway stations
Woodstock, Illinois
Railway stations in the United States opened in 1915
Railway stations in McHenry County, Illinois